Kotra Tso, or Guozha Lake,
previously called Lake Lighten, is a glacial lake in Rutog County in the Ngari Prefecture in the northwest of the Tibet Autonomous Region of China. It lies in the western Kunlun Mountains to the northwest of Bangda Lake, not far from the regional border with Xinjiang.  Located at an altitude of 5080 metres, it covers an area of 244 square kilometres with a maximum depth of 81.9 metres and has a drainage basin containing 62 glaciers.

India's claim line in Aksai Chin runs along the water-parting line of Lake Lighten and the Amtogor Lake to the west. However, China has claimed the whole of Aksai Chin in 1959.

Maps

Notes

References

Ngari Prefecture
Lakes of Tibet